The discography of Joseph Utsler, an American rapper better known by his hip hop persona of the wicked clown Shaggy 2 Dope, consists of two studio albums and two extended plays. Collaborations are also included, as are film and television appearances and home video releases. In addition to his solo career, Utsler has also been involved with eight hip hop groups; JJ Boys, Inner City Posse, Insane Clown Posse, Golden Goldies, Dark Lotus, Psychopathic Rydas, Soopa Villainz and The Killjoy Club.

He has gained success predominantly as a member of the duo Insane Clown Posse, where he has earned three gold albums and two platinum albums. Along with member Joseph "Violent J" Bruce, Utsler founded the independent record label Psychopathic Records with Alex Abbiss as manager in 1991. He has also produced and starred in the feature films Big Money Hustlas and Big Money Rustlas.

Solo albums

Studio albums

Extended plays

Music videos

Group albums

w/Inner City Posse

w/Insane Clown Posse

w/Golden Goldies

w/Dark Lotus

w/Psychopathic Rydas

w/Soopa Villainz

Guest appearances

Solo

w/Violent J (Insane Clown Posse)

w/Violent J & Esham (Soopa Villainz)

Anybody Killa: Hatchet Warrior (2003) - "Now You Know"
Anybody Killa: Dirty History (2004) - "Nevahoe"
Anybody Killa: Mudface (2008) - "You aint a Killa"
The R.O.C.: Welcome to the Dark Side (2008) - "Hello"
Twiztid: Cryptic Collection Vol. 3 (2004) - "She Said (Remix)"
Twiztid: The Green Book (album) (2003) - "I'm the Only 1"
Twiztid: Man's Myth (Vol. 1) - (2005) "Entity"
Violent J: Wizard of the Hood (2003) - "The Wizard's Palace"
Violent J: The Shining (2009) - "Home Invasion"

Original contributions to compilations

Solo

w/Violent J (Insane Clown Posse)

Let 'Em Bleed: The Mixxtape, Vol. 1 (2008) - "Fall Apart"
Let 'Em Bleed: The Mixxtape, Vol. 2 (2008) - "Knee Crakaz", "Filthy"
Let 'Em Bleed: The Mixxtape, Vol. 3 (2008) - "Can't Hold Us Back '08", "Can't Fuck With Us"
Psychopathics from Outer Space Part 2  (2003)- Do It
Psychopathics from Outer Space 3 (2008)- Last Day Alive

Videography
 ICP's Strangle-Mania (1995), as "Handsome" Harley 'Gweedo' Guestella
Shockumentary (1997), as Shaggy 2 Dope
ECW Hardcore Heaven 1997, as Shaggy 2 Dope
WWF Summerslam (1998), as Shaggy 2 Dope
Backstage Sluts (1999), as Shaggy 2 Dope
Strangle Mania 2 (1999), as "Handsome" Harley 'Gweedo' Guestella
WCW Road Wild (1999), as Shaggy 2 Dope
The Shaggy Show (2000), as Shaggy 2 Dope
JCW, Volume One (2000), as "Handsome" Harley 'Gweedo' Guestella, and as Shaggy 2 Dope
JCW, Volume 2 (2001), as "Handsome" Harley 'Gweedo' Guestella, and as Shaggy 2 Dope
XPW Redemption (2001), as Shaggy 2 Dope
Bootlegged in L.A. (2003), as Shaggy 2 Dope
Psychopathic: The Videos (2007), as Shaggy 2 Dope
JCW: SlamTV - Episodes 1 thru 9 (2007), as "Handsome" Harley 'Gweedo' Guestella
JCW: SlamTV - Episodes 10 thru 15 featuring Bloodymania (2007), as "Handsome" Harley 'Gweedo' Guestella, and as Shaggy 2 Dope

Filmography

Film appearances
Big Money Hustlas (2000), as Sugar Bear
Bowling Balls (2004), as Shaggy
Death Racers (2008), as Shaggy 2 Dope
Big Money Rustlas (2010), as Sugar Wolf

Television and internet programs
The Shaggy Show (2000), as Shaggy 2 Dope
Mad TV (2002), as Shaggy 2 Dope
G4 TV  (2006), as Shaggy 2 Dope
Aqua Teen Hunger Force  (2010), as Shaggy 2 Dope
The Shaggy and The Creep Show  (2020), as Shaggy 2 Dope w/ Kegan The Creep

References

Hip hop discographies
Discographies of American artists